Konuktepe is a village in the Gümüşhacıköy District, Amasya Province, Turkey. Its population is 84 (2022). The village was mentioned as Siyah in 1928.

Demographics

References

Villages in Gümüşhacıköy District